Log Cabin is a city in Henderson County, Texas, United States. The population was 714 at the 2010 census.

Geography

Log Cabin is located in western Henderson County at  (32.223427, –96.022415). It is bordered to the south by Caney City. Texas State Highway 198 passes through the west side of Log Cabin, leading northwest  to Mabank and south  to Malakoff.

Log Cabin and Caney City are located on a peninsula at the southeast part of Cedar Creek Reservoir, with Clear Creek to the northwest and Caney Creek to the southeast. The reservoir drains west via an artificial channel to the Trinity River.

Demographics

As of the census of 2000, there were 733 people, 303 households, and 206 families residing in the city. The population density was 691.3 people per square mile (267.0/km). There were 548 housing units at an average density of 516.8/sq mi (199.6/km). The racial makeup of the city was 96.59% White, 1.09% African American, 0.82% Native American, 0.68% Asian, 0.55% from other races, and 0.27% from two or more races. Hispanic or Latino of any race were 2.73% of the population.

There were 303 households, out of which 27.1% had children under the age of 18 living with them, 54.5% were married couples living together, 11.6% had a female householder with no husband present, and 31.7% were non-families. 26.4% of all households were made up of individuals, and 12.2% had someone living alone who was 65 years of age or older. The average household size was 2.42 and the average family size was 2.90.

In the city, the population was spread out, with 24.0% under the age of 18, 5.9% from 18 to 24, 24.1% from 25 to 44, 25.2% from 45 to 64, and 20.7% who were 65 years of age or older. The median age was 42 years. For every 100 females, there were 98.6 males. For every 100 females age 18 and over, there were 98.9 males.

The median income for a household in the city was $24,438, and the median income for a family was $28,125. Males had a median income of $17,188 versus $15,875 for females. The per capita income for the city was $14,364. About 23.6% of families and 28.4% of the population were below the poverty line, including 40.3% of those under age 18 and 13.5% of those age 65 or over.

See also

 List of cities in Texas

References

External links

 

Cities in Texas
Cities in Henderson County, Texas